Dahod is a city on the banks of the Dudhimati River in Dahod District in the State of Gujarat, India. It is said that it has taken its name from Saint Dadhichi, who had an Ashram on the bank of Dudhumati river. The city serves as District Headquarters for Dahod District. It is also known as Dohad (meaning "two boundaries", as the borders of the states of Rajasthan and Madhya Pradesh are nearby).

Mughal Emperor Aurangzeb was born in Dahod in 1618, during the reign of Jahangir. Aurangzeb was said to have ordered his ministers to favour this town, as it was his birthplace. Tatya Tope, the freedom fighter, is known to have absconded in Dahod. He is believed to have lived his last days in this region.

It was previously within the boundaries of Panchmahal District. However, in 2006, Dahod was recognized as a separate district. Urban Bank Hospital is situated here. The foundation stone for a dental college was laid by the trust of philanthropist Girdharlal Sheth.

The railway colony, also known as Parel area of Dahod was built by the British and it still follows the same architecture.There is also a western railway locomotive workshop here, and this area contributes to population of mostly people from other states, working here in railways workshop. Dahod is taking step into digital era also.
Iskcon Dahod also functions here for the welfare of society by providing them cultural and value based education, youth program.
Dahod has been selected as one of the hundred Indian cities to be developed as a smart city under Prime Minister Narendra Modi's flagship Smart Cities Mission.

Demographics 
As per the 2011 census, Dahod had a population of 130,503. Males constituted 51% of the population and females 49%. Dahod had an average literacy rate of 83.57%, higher than the national average of 74.04%.

Education 
Educational institutions in Dahod include: Hindi Higher Secondary School, Hindi Primary School, Edunova, St. Stephen's Higher Secondary School, Government Engineering College, St. Mary School, Government Polytechnic, M.Y. High School, S&I Dadararwala higher secondary school, Little Flowers School, Shashi Dhan Day School, Jamali English School, Burhani English Medium School, R.L. Pandya High School, Sunrise Public School, Kendriya Vidyalaya, Jawahar Navodaya Vidyalaya, Shree Gnanjyot Secondary and High Secondary School, and Aadivasi Secondary and Higher Secondary School. Many other village government schools.

Cuisine 

Kachori, Samosa, Ratlami sev and Panipuri are the main namkeen of the city. Dahod is also known for Mattha and Pakwan. Ratlami Sev Bhandar and Dhaval Restaurant are the hotspot for snacks in Dahod and is famous for its Kachori all over Gujarat.

Health 
Dahod is also a medical hub for Gujarat, and surrounding areas of Rajasthan and Madhya Pradesh. Dahod hosts some non-profit health centers like Urban 
hospital, Anjuman Trust, and Government Hospital. Drashtri Netralaya is a famous non-profit eye clinic with a staff of 20+ specialists. It also offers a Diploma in Optometry course.

Economy

Real estate market 
In recent years, the real estate in Dahod has increased in value considerably.
Dahod has been part of international service organization Lions Clubs International, five clubs are active in community service here.

Arts and authors 
The town's Najmi Masjeed mosque, inaugurated in 2002, is one of the largest mosques in the Dawoodi Bohra community. The people of Dahod are very polite and secular to every religion and live peacefully which makes the unique feature of Dahod. Sachin Desai's Gujarati book 'dahod.com' is very popular in Dahod. Sachin Desai wrote 'Dokiyu' coloumn for dahod from 1992-'93 to 2018's 25 years .
Dahod is also famous for its handicraft products by Sahaj-An Organisation for Women's Development, an NGO with outreach to 3000 women, Founded in 2001, Sahaj Create fine handicraft products and an established brand in tribal handicraft in India and the world.

Climate

Transport

Road ways

Road Connectivity
Dahod is connected to all major towns of Gujarat by public transport service operated by GSRTC.

Railways

Dahod comes under the Western Railways of Indian Railways and it is on New Delhi–Mumbai main line. The specialty of Dahod is that it marks the beginning and the end of Gujarat on Western Railways line. Few years back the facade of Dahod Railway station was also modernized. The fastest train to reach Mumbai or New Delhi (Hazrat Nizamuddin) from Dahod is August Kranti Rajdhani Express. On 25 April 2018 Ministry of Railways decided to give stoppage of August Kranti Rajdhani Express at Dahod plus, prestigious trains like Golden Temple Mail, Avantika Express, Paschim Express and Mumbai Jaipur (Gangaur) Superfast  also halts at Dahod. Other than that Dahod is well connected to major cities of India. Dahod handles the traffic of around 106 trains out of which 7 trains originates and terminates at Dahod. After completion of Dahod-Indore rail line project Dahod will turn into a Junction.

Dahod was selected for construction of POH workshop for steam locomotive fleet because of its pleasant weather, availability of cheap land and sincere workforce. Dahod is also ideally situated mid-way between Bombay and Delhi, the main route of BB&CI Railway broad gauge system. Initially trained staff was transferred from Parel to Dahod. A full-fledged colony was constructed for accommodating full strength of staff. Mr. Hendree Freeland established the colony that is named after him as Freelandganj. The foundation of Locomotive workshop, Dahod was laid by Sir Clement Hindlay Kt, then Chief Commissioner of Railways (India), on 14 th January 1926. It took about 4 years to complete the construction of the workshop and a steam powerhouse attached to the workshop, the office complex and staff amenities like colony, main hospital, area health units, railway institutes etc. Originally, the workshop at Lower Parel (Bombay) was catering to the requirement of POH of locomotives, passenger carriages and freight cars of then Bombay, Baroda and Central India (BB&CI) Railway. With the increase in the train services, Lower Parel workshop was not able to cope with the arising of all the three types of rolling stock. Therefore, it was decided to shift locomotive POH activity from Lower Parel to some other place.

Airport

Nearest Airports are Vadodara Airport (125 km) and Ahmedabad Airport (210 km).

References

Cities and towns in Dahod district